The first season of Fear the Walking Dead, an American horror-drama television series on AMC, premiered on August 23, 2015, and concluded on October 4, 2015, consisting of six episodes. The series is a companion series and prequel to The Walking Dead, which is based on the comic book series of the same name by Robert Kirkman, Tony Moore, and Charlie Adlard. It was executive produced by Kirkman, David Alpert, Greg Nicotero, Gale Anne Hurd, and Dave Erickson, with Erickson assuming the role of showrunner. On March 9, 2015, AMC announced it had ordered Fear the Walking Dead to series, with a two-season commitment. The second season, comprising 15 episodes, premiered on April 10, 2016. 

The season follows a dysfunctional, blended family composed of Madison Clark (Kim Dickens), her fiancé Travis Manawa (Cliff Curtis), her daughter Alicia (Alycia Debnam-Carey), her drug-addicted son Nick (Frank Dillane) and Travis' son Chris (Lorenzo James Henrie) from a previous marriage to Liza Ortiz (Elizabeth Rodriguez). At the onset of the zombie apocalypse, their group is joined by Daniel Salazar (Rubén Blades), his wife Griselda (Patricia Reyes Spíndola), and their daughter Ofelia (Mercedes Mason). The families navigate through Los Angeles in search of a safe haven.

Production

Development
In September 2013, AMC announced they were developing a companion series to The Walking Dead, which follows a different set of characters created by Robert Kirkman. In September 2014, AMC ordered a pilot, which was written by Kirkman and Dave Erickson, and directed by Adam Davidson, and is executive produced by Kirkman, Erickson, Gale Anne Hurd, and David Alpert, with Erickson serving as showrunner. The project was originally known as Cobalt.

Casting
In December 2014, the first four starring roles were cast: Kim Dickens as Madison, the female lead; Cliff Curtis as Travis Manawa, the male lead; Frank Dillane as Nick; and Alycia Debnam-Carey as Alicia. In April and May, 2015, Elizabeth Rodriguez and Mercedes Mason were announced as series regulars, both in unknown roles.

Filming
Production of the pilot episode began in early 2015 and ended on February 6, 2015. The pilot episode was filmed in Los Angeles; the remaining first-season episodes were filmed in Vancouver, British Columbia, Canada. Production on the remaining five first-season episodes began on May 11, 2015. Adam Davidson, who directed the pilot, also directed the series' second and third episodes.

Cast

Main cast
The first season features eight actors receiving main cast billing status:
 Kim Dickens as Madison Clark: An intelligent and domineering high school guidance counselor, the mother of Nick and Alicia, and Travis' fiancée.
 Cliff Curtis as Travis Manawa: A resolute and peacekeeping high school teacher, Madison's fiancé, Chris' father, and Liza's ex-husband.
 Frank Dillane as Nick Clark: A brave and selfless recovering heroin addict, Madison's son, and Alicia's brother.
 Alycia Debnam-Carey as Alicia Clark: The fiery yet compassionate daughter of Madison, and the sister of Nick.
 Elizabeth Rodriguez as Liza Ortiz: A no-nonsense and caring nursing student, Travis' ex-wife, and Chris' mother.
 Mercedes Mason as Ofelia Salazar: The strong-willed and very capable daughter of Daniel and his wife Griselda.
 Lorenzo James Henrie as Chris Manawa: Travis and Liza's rebellious teenage son, who becomes more brutal due to the landscape of the deadly new world.
 Rubén Blades as Daniel Salazar: A courageous and practical former Sombra Negra member, a barber, Griselda's husband, and Ofelia's father.

Supporting cast
 Patricia Reyes Spíndola as Griselda Salazar: Ofelia's mother, who emigrated from El Salvador with her husband Daniel to escape political unrest. 
 Scott Lawrence as Art "Artie" Costa: The principal at the high school where Madison and Travis work. 
 Lincoln A. Castellanos as Tobias: A wise-beyond-his-years high school senior.
 Maestro Harrell as Matt Sale: Alicia's boyfriend. 
 Shawn Hatosy as Cpl. Andrew Adams: A well-intentioned military man with a soulful disposition, who is out of his element. 
 Jamie McShane as Lt. Moyers: The leader of the National Guard contingent in charge of protecting Madison's neighborhood. He does not take the complaints of the citizens too seriously and is a loose cannon. 
 Sandrine Holt as Dr. Bethany Exner: A confident and skilled doctor.
 Colman Domingo as Victor Strand: A smart and sophisticated businessman with a mysterious past.

Guest cast
 Keith Powers as Calvin: Nick's best friend and drug dealer.
 Leon Thomas III as Russell: One of Travis' students before the outbreak.

Episodes

Reception

Critical response

On Rotten Tomatoes, the season has a rating of 76%, based on 63 reviews, whose average rating is 6.75/10. The site's critical consensus reads, "Fear the Walking Dead recycles elements of its predecessor, but it's still moody and engrossing enough to compete with the original." On Metacritic, the season has a score of 66 out of 100, based on 33 critics, indicating "generally favorable reviews".

Elisabeth Vincentelli of the New York Post rated the first two episodes three out of four stars, stating that "[They] are creepily suspenseful–they're great examples of how effective a slow pace and a moody atmosphere can be." Another positive review of the first episode came from Ken Tucker of Yahoo TV, who wrote, "Fear the Walking Dead is a mood piece, more artful than the original series" and that the cast is "terrific". Tim Goodman of The Hollywood Reporter gave an average review, writing, "The 90-minute first episode and the hour-long second episode are, while not actually boring, certainly less magnetic than the original."

One of the harshest negative reviews came from HitFix, on Daniel Fienberg and Alan Sepinwall's podcast, where Fienberg called the premiere episode "awful, just horrible ... as bad as The Walking Dead has ever gotten at its very worst. This is that bad. I've been kind of stunned to see people being generous to it. ... I thought this was almost unwatchably bad." Sepinwall called his B− review "slightly generous".

Ratings
The U.S. series premiere attracted 10.1 million total viewers, with 6.3 million in the advertiser-coveted 18-to-49-year-old demographic, both cable television records for a series premiere. Numerous international debuts of the pilot also set ratings records. The first season averaged 11.2 million viewers in "live plus-3" ratings (includes VOD and DVR viewing within three days after initial telecast) to become the highest-rated first season of any series in cable history.

Home media
The first season was released on Blu-ray and DVD on December 1, 2015. A special edition version of the first season was released on Blu-ray and DVD on March 22, 2016, with new bonus features, including deleted scenes, seven featurettes, and audio commentaries by cast and crew, on all six episodes.

References

External links 
 
 

01
2015 American television seasons